Loughlynch or Lough Lynch is a townland in the parish of Billy, County Antrim, Northern Ireland. It lies about 3½ miles south-east of Bushmills and was once the site of a lake.

History
Gillaspick MacDonnell’s widow, according to tradition gave birth to Coll MacGillaspick (Coll Ciotach) upon Glasineerin Island on Lough Lynch.

Citations

References
 

Former lakes of the United Kingdom
Geography of County Antrim